Blaine County is a county located in the U.S. state of Oklahoma. As of the 2020 census, the population was 8,735.  Its county seat is Watonga. Part of the Cheyenne-Arapaho land opening in 1892, the county had gained rail lines by the early 1900s and highways by the 1930s. The county was named for James G. Blaine, an American politician who was the Republican presidential candidate in 1884 and Secretary of State under President Benjamin Harrison.

History

Blaine County was one of several counties created by the Land Run of 1892. It was designated as county "C" beginning in 1890 before the land run.  According to one account, the designation "C" remained until the first public elections in 1892. When the time came to choose another name for the county, there seemed to be roughly equal support for two military heroes: "Sheridan" and "Custer". Before voting began, the chairman gave a stirring speech proposing Blaine, who had recently died, and who was a local favorite. The majority of voters swung behind Blaine's name, which was ultimately chosen for County C.  The area was settled by Creek and Seminole, whom the federal government relocated to the area in the 1820s and 1830s. The Cheyenne and Arapaho tribes were relocated to the area from Colorado in 1869, after the Reconstruction Treaties of 1866 had taken the land back from the Creek and Seminole.

The land run was held after giving members of the tribe allotments of  each.

A post office was established in the county seat of Watonga, the same year as the land run. The Enid and Anadarko Railway and the Blackwell, Enid and Southwestern Railroad both ran lines through the county from 1901 to 1903. The Blaine County Courthouse was built in 1906.

The town of Geary, which also received a post office in the same year as the land run, became an agricultural trade center in the county, and had a population of 2,561 by 1902. The town was home to "the oldest bank in Blaine County." Okeene was also established in the year of the land run and was surrounded by farmers of German descent.

In 1904, Blaine County was the birthplace of voice actor Clarence Nash, the original voice of Disney's Donald Duck. The county's population was 17,227 in 1907, and rose to 17,960 in 1910. It had declined to 15,875 by 1920.

The U.S. highway system reached Oklahoma in 1926. U.S. Highways 270 and 281 were constructed through Blaine County. The county was also served by the Postal Highway as early as 1912; it later became part of U.S. Highway 66.

The county's population peaked at 20,452 in 1930. New Deal programs such as the Civilian Conservation Corps employed county residents and built Roman Nose State Park, which opened in 1937.

By the 21st century, the county had a population of 11,976. Between 2010 and 2020 the population of Blaine County declined by 26.9 percent to 8,735. It was the largest decrease in percentage terms during the decade of any Oklahoma county. Although population decreases are typical of most rural Oklahoma countries, much of the population decline of Blaine County from 2010 to 2020 was due to the closing in 2010 of a prison which was the largest employer in the county.

Government
The county is served by seven elected county officials: a county sheriff, three county commissioners, a county clerk, a county assessor, and a county treasurer. The three commissioners each have districts with approximately equal populations based on the latest census. The county government is primarily housed in the Blaine County Courthouse in Watonga.

Geography
The northeastern half of the county is located on the western edge of the Red Bed Plains while the southwestern half lies in the Gypsum Hills. The North Canadian River runs through the county from northwest to southeast.

The county includes the largest lake in western Oklahoma, Canton Lake.

The county seat of Watonga hosts an annual cheese festival in October, celebrating the city's cheese factory.

Major highways
  U.S. Highway 270
  U.S. Highway 281
  State Highway 3
  State Highway 8
  State Highway 51
  State Highway 58

Adjacent counties
 Major County (north)
 Kingfisher County (east)
 Canadian County (southeast)
 Caddo County (south)
 Custer County (southwest)
 Dewey County (northwest)

Demographics

As of the census of 2000, there were 11,976 people, 4,159 households, and 2,865 families residing in the county, nearly half of them located in the county seat of Watonga. The population density of the county was 13 people per square mile (5/km2). There were 5,208 housing units at an average density of 6 per square mile (2/km2). The racial makeup of the county was 76.29% white, 8.70% Native American, 6.65% Black or African American, 0.71% Asian, 0.81% Pacific Islander, 2.86% from other races, and 3.97% from two or more races. Hispanic or Latino individuals of any race made up 6.62% of the population.

There were 4,159 households, out of which 30.80% had children under the age of 18 living with them. Slightly more than half (56.20%) were married couples living together, nearly a third (29%) were made up of individuals, 15.5% had someone living alone who was 65 years or age or older, and 8.6% were run by a female with no husband present. The average household size was 2.50 and the average family size was 3.08.

The median age of the county in 2000 was 38 years, with almost a third (28.6%) of the population aged 25 to 44. Individuals under the age of 18 made up 24% of the population, individuals age 45 to 64 made up 21.4% of the population, individuals age 65 or older made up 16.8% of the population, and individuals between the ages of 18 to 24 made up 9.1% of the population. There were slightly more males than females, with 119.3 males for every 100 females and 125 adult males (18 or older) for every 100 female adults.

The median income for a household in the county in 2000 was $28,356, and the median income for a family was $34,565. Males had a median income of $26,284 versus $18,619 for females. The per capita income for the county was $13,546. About 12.8 percent of families and 16.9% of the population were below the poverty line, including 22.2% of those under age 18 and 13.2% of those age 65 or over.

Politics

Economy
Southard, located in central Blaine County, is the site of one of the purest gypsum deposits in the United States and is home to the U.S. Gypsum Company, the largest industrial plant in the county.

Lying in the Cimarron Valley, Okeene's economy has been based in agriculture, primarily wheat and hay. Major manufacturing businesses are the Okeene Milling Company, Seaboard Farms, and Mountain Country Foods, a manufacturer of pet food. The Okeene Municipal Hospital and Clinic is one of the primary medical centers of northwest Oklahoma.

Communities

 Bucher
 Canton
 Darrow
 Eagle City
 Geary
 Greenfield
 Hitchcock
 Hydro
 Longdale
 Okeene
 Southard
 Watonga (county seat)

NRHP sites

The following sites in Blaine County are listed on the National Register of Historic Places:

References

External links
 Encyclopedia of Oklahoma History and Culture - Blaine County
 Oklahoma Digital Maps: Digital Collections of Oklahoma and Indian Territory

 
1890 establishments in Oklahoma Territory
Populated places established in 1890